Robert Kent (born Douglas Blackley, Jr.; December 3, 1908 – May 4, 1955), was an American film actor. His career included starring roles in several film serials of the 1940s, including The Phantom Creeps, Who's Guilty?, and The Phantom Rider. He also had a role in the 1938 film The Gladiator and was Virginia Vale's leading man in Blonde Comet, a 1941 movie about a female racing driver.

He married actress Astrid Allwyn in Tijuana, Mexico, on January 10, 1937, and they were divorced in 1941. He had three children: Kristina, Susan, and Kim Louise. He died in Los Angeles, California of a coronary occlusion due to coronary arteriosclerosis.

Partial filmography

 One Hour Late (1934) - Soda Jerk (uncredited)
 Car 99 (1935) - Recruit Blatzky
 Four Hours to Kill! (1935) - George Nelson
 Love in Bloom (1935) - Man Who Buys Song (uncredited)
 College Scandal (1935) - Dan Courtridge
 Two for Tonight (1935) - College Boy (uncredited)
 Ship Cafe (1935) - Jimmy (uncredited)
 Love Before Breakfast (1936) - First College Boy (uncredited)
 The Country Beyond (1936) - Cpl. Robert King
 The Crime of Dr. Forbes (1936) - Dr. Michael Forbes
 King of the Royal Mounted (1936) - RCMP Sgt. King
 Dimples (1936) - Allen Drew
 Reunion (1936) - Tony Luke
 Nancy Steele Is Missing! (1937) - Jimmie Wilson
 Step Lively, Jeeves! (1937) - Gerry Townsend
 That I May Live (1937) - Dick Mannion
 Angel's Holiday (1937) - Nick Moore
 Born Reckless (1937) - Lee Martin
 The 13th Man (1937) - Jack Winslow (uncredited)
 Charlie Chan at Monte Carlo (1937) - Gordon Chase
 Mr. Moto Takes a Chance (1938) - Marty Weston
 Highway Patrol (1938) - Patrolman (uncredited)
 The Gladiator (1938) - Tom Dixon
 Wanted by the Police (1938) - Policeman Mike O'Leary
 Gang Bullets (1938) - John Carter
 Little Orphan Annie (1938) - Johnny Adams
 The Phantom Creeps (1939) - Capt. Bob West
 Convict's Code (1939) - Dave Tyler
 Almost a Gentleman (1939) - Robert Mabrey
 East Side of Heaven (1939) - Cyrus Barrett Jr.
 For Love or Money (1939) - Ted Frazier
 Andy Hardy Gets Spring Fever (1939) - Ensign Copley
 The Secret of Dr. Kildare (1939) - Charles Herron
 Calling All Marines (1939) - Minor Role (uncredited)
 One Million B.C. (1940) - Mountain Guide (uncredited)
 Sunset in Wyoming (1941) - Larry Drew
 Twilight on the Trail (1941) - Ash Drake
 Niagara Falls (1941) - Hotel Guest (uncredited)
 Blonde Comet (1941) - Jim Flynn
 Tillie the Toiler (1941)
 Stagecoach Express (1942) - Griff Williams
 The Forest Rangers (1942) - Lookout (uncredited)
 Stand by for Action (1942) - Hank Nels (uncredited)
 Yanks Ahoy (1943) - Lt. Reeves
 Find the Blackmailer (1943) - Mark Harper
 Northern Pursuit (1943) - Soldier (uncredited)
 Gung Ho! (1943) - Submarine Navigator Robinson (uncredited)
 What a Man! (1944) - Steven M. Anderson
 Hot Rhythm (1944) - Herman Strohbach
 What Next, Corporal Hargrove? (1945) - Lt. Dillon
 Who's Guilty? (1945) - Bob Stewart
 The Phantom Rider (1946, Serial) - Dr. Jim Sterling / The Phantom Rider
 Blonde Alibi (1946) - Detective (uncredited)
 Joe Palooka, Champ (1946) - Ronnie Brewster
 Shoot to Kill (1947) - Dixie Logan
 Jungle Flight (1947) - Andy Melton
 Dragnet (1947) - Police Lt. Ricco
 Big Town After Dark (1947) - Jake Sebastian
 The Counterfeiters (1948) - Tony Richards
 Wild Weed (1949) - Lt. Mason
 Radar Secret Service (1950) - Benson - Henchman
 Federal Agent at Large (1950) - Harry Monahan
 The Skipper Surprised His Wife (1950) - Radio Technician (uncredited)
 For Heaven's Sake (1950) - Roger Blake, Joe's Father (uncredited)
 The Wild Blue Yonder (1951) - General (uncredited)
 Rebel City (1953) - Captain Ramsey
 The Country Girl (1954) - Paul Unger
 The Great Locomotive Chase (1956) - A Switchman (final film role)

References

External links

Announcement of Robert Kent's marriage to Astrid Allwyn

1908 births
1955 deaths
American male film actors
Male actors from Hartford, Connecticut
20th-century American male actors